Maraqiya is a Syrian village located in Tartus District, Tartus. According to the Syria Central Bureau of Statistics (CBS), Maraqiya had a population of 1,254 in the 2004 census.

References

Populated places in Tartus District